Purine-rich element binding protein G is a protein that in humans is encoded by the PURG gene.

Function 

The exact function of this gene is not known, however, its encoded product is highly similar to purine-rich element binding protein A (PURA). The latter is a DNA-binding protein which binds preferentially to the single strand of the purine-rich element termed PUR, and has been implicated in the control of both DNA replication and transcription. This gene lies in close proximity to the Werner syndrome gene, but on the opposite strand, on chromosome 8p11. Two transcript variants encoding different isoforms have been found for this gene.

References